The Overseas Filipino Workers (OFW) Hospital and Diagnostic Center, simply known as the OFW Hospital, is a specialty hospital under construction in the San Fernando, Pampanga, Philippines. It is meant to cater to Filipino migrant workers.

History
The Philippine government planned to set up a hospital dedicated to Filipino migrant workers, officially classified as Overseas Filipino Workers.

The provincial government of Pampanga donated the land where the OFW Hospital will be built.  Bloomberry Cultural Foundation Inc. of the Razon Group will fund the construction.

The groundbreaking ceremony for the OFW Hospital was held on May 1, 2019. Actual construction began in February 2020 Progress on the construction was hampered by the COVID-19 pandemic. The Department of Labor and Employment and President Rodrigo Duterte, through an executive order, has fast-tracked the hospital project.

Facilities
The OFW Hospital will have a bed capacity of 100. It is intended mainly to serve  Overseas Filipino Workers (OFWs) and their dependents.

References

Hospitals in the Philippines
Buildings and structures in Pampanga
Buildings and structures under construction in the Philippines